Deon Joseph Dyer nickname "Gunsmoke" (born October 2, 1977 in Chesapeake, Virginia) is a former American football fullback in the National Football League. He was originally drafted by the Miami Dolphins in the fourth round of the 2000 NFL Draft. He played college football at the North Carolina.

Deon began working as a high school football coach at Pine Crest School, yet he left to pursue other options in 2014. 
He now works at Deep Creek High School.

References

External links
NFL stats
AFL stats

1977 births
Living people
Sportspeople from Chesapeake, Virginia
American football fullbacks
North Carolina Tar Heels football players
Miami Dolphins players
Houston Texans players
Columbus Destroyers players